Empresa Agroindustrial Pomalca is a leading agribusiness company based in Chiclayo, Peru. It is one of the country's major sugar producers. It is an exporter of refined sugar to the United States.

References 

Agriculture companies of Peru
Sugar companies